Bristol Palin: Life's a Tripp is an American reality television series that premiered on Lifetime. The series, featuring Bristol Palin, debuted on June 19, 2012.

Premise
The series follows the day-to-day life of Bristol Palin as she adjusts to life in Alaska after temporarily residing in California.

Episodes

Reception
The pilot episode of Palin's series had an estimated 726,000 viewers, with a rating of 0.2 percent among adults aged 18–49. After performing even worse the second week, Lifetime decided to move the show from its original primetime slot, at 10:00 p.m., to an hour later, and to show repeats of the series Dance Moms at 10:00 p.m.

Palin's series has received mostly negative reviews, with Entertainment Weekly calling it a "weird, miserable reality show."  San Francisco Chronicles David Wiegand said, "She's just not that interesting."  Times James Poniewozik has called the show "misguided" and commented that it fails to show Palin as a struggling young mother as she is seen at boutiques, Starbucks, and at bars. The Washington Posts Hank Stuever said everything in Palin's show "reeks of reality TV tropes: The massive SUVs Bristol cruises around in, the insipid boutiques where she shops, her Beverly Hills mansion that looks like a Bachelorette set, the blatantly staged conversations, the annoyingly visible microphone packs." He then called the show "maddeningly unreal."

Lawsuits
Prior to the show's airing, it had already been the subject of lawsuits. In September 2011, Palin was heckled by Stephen Hanks in a West Hollywood bar while being filmed for the show. When footage of the heated argument was shown on the show's advertisements, Hanks sued Palin for defamation saying he never signed any permission waiver to be shown on television.

References

External links
 

2010s American reality television series
2012 American television series debuts
2012 American television series endings
English-language television shows
Sarah Palin
Television series by Associated Television International
Television shows set in Alaska